Ol' Waylon is an album by American country music artist Waylon Jennings, released on RCA Victor in 1977.  It eventually became one of Jennings' highest-selling albums, due in no small part to the phenomenal success of the chart-topping "Luckenbach, Texas (Back to the Basics of Love)."  It was also the singer's fourth solo album in a row to reach the top of the country charts, remaining there for thirteen weeks and becoming country music's first platinum album by any single solo artist.

Background
By 1977, Jennings was in the midst of his critical and commercial prime, having scored two consecutive #1 albums (1975's Dreaming My Dreams and 1976's Are You Ready for the Country) and having been one of the stars featured on Wanted! The Outlaws, a compilation of old RCA Victor recordings also featuring Willie Nelson, Tompall Glaser, and Jennings' wife Jessi Colter. It quickly became country music's first million selling LP. Along with Nelson, Jennings was on the cutting edge of what was being referred to as "progressive" country music, or outlaw country.  Jennings had accomplished these feats in a remarkably short time after RCA finally allowed him to produce his own records in 1972.  Almost immediately, he hit his stride with the seminal outlaw albums Lonesome, On'ry and Mean and Honky Tonk Heroes, both released in 1973.  He won the CMA Award for Vocalist of the Year in 1975 and Duo of the Year in 1976 with Nelson for their smash duet "Good Hearted Woman."  "People came out to hear our outlaw shows like they were rock concerts," Tompall Glaser recalled in Nelson's 1988 autobiography Willie: An Autobiography.  "All at once we were in coliseums and stadiums, we had tractor-trailer trucks and a huge overhead."

Recording and composition
By the end of 1976, Jennings, who had mainly produced himself since his 1973 album Lonesome, On'ry and Mean with input from friends like Glaser, Nelson, Jack Clement, and Ken Mansfield, opted  for a "name" producer: Chips Moman.   Moman had produced numerous rock and R&B hits, worked with Elvis Presley,  and had written soul classics like "Do Right Woman" and "The Dark End of the Street."  After relocating his American Studios from Memphis to Nashville, Moman and Jennings began recording the album that would become Ol' Waylon supported by the Waylors and guitarist Reggie Young.  The album's biggest hit - and the biggest hit single of Jennings' career - was "Luckenbach, Texas (Back to the Basics of Love)," written by Moman and keyboardist Bobby Emmons.  The song references a couple whose position in "high society" has placed strains on their marriage and finances ("four-car garage and we're still buildin' on"). As Andrew Dansby of Rolling Stone wrote in Jennings' obituary in 2002, "The song was part of a self-referential trinity for Jennings, who was always first to call bullshit when a scene had gotten out of hand. The song condemns 'this successful life we're living' that had Willie, Waylon and the boys living like 'the Hatfields and McCoys.' The spoils of success frequently made Jennings uncomfortable." Luckenbach, a microscopic hamlet 80 miles from Austin, became a metaphor for spiritual renewal, although most people had never heard of it.  In his autobiography, Jennings admitted that he hated the song immediately, feeling it was too similar to the laid back "Good Time Charlie's Got the Blues," but also recognized that it was a sure hit.  It debuted on April 16, 1977 reaching #1 on the country charts on May 21, 1977 and staying there until June 25, 1977. It also reached #25 on the pop charts, causing Ol' Waylon to skyrocket to the top of the country album charts and hit #15 on Billboard Top LPs and Tapes chart. Willie Nelson, whose own monumental success had begun to eclipse Jennings', makes a cameo on the song near the end. Moman also contributed "Brand New Goodbye Song," which he wrote with Reggie Young.
  
Ol' Waylon includes a version of "Lucille," a song that would be Kenny Rogers' first major hit as a solo artist that same year.  Jennings' recording, which contains slightly altered lyrics and up-tempo verses, was not released as a single.  The singer chose to cover Neil Diamond's "Sweet Caroline" and included a medley of Elvis Presley hits originally composed by bluesman Arthur Crudup: "That's All Right" and "My Baby Left Me" (Presley would die just two months after Ol' Waylon was released).  Other songs found on Ol' Waylon appear to betray Jennings own discomfort with the success he was having.  Unlike Nelson, who seemed to embrace his growing fame with the laissez faire attitude of a free spirit, Jennings refused to attend award ceremonies and resented losing his privacy. He also began using cocaine, which replaced the amphetamines that had sustained him through years on the road in the 1960s and early 1970s.  Song titles like "This Is Getting Funny (But There Ain't Nobody Laughing)" and "I Think I'm Gonna Kill Myself" appear to reflect this turmoil, in spite of the former's gospel-infused piano and the latter's bouncy, devil-may-care rhythm.   Jennings' also delivers a moving vocal on Rodney Crowell's tormented "Till I Gain Control Again."  Perhaps the LP's most curious cut is the Jimmy Webb song "If You See Me Getting Smaller"; addressed to Willie, the song can be interpreted as either Waylon's acknowledgment of his friend's usurping success or his own retreat into drug addiction.  In the 2003 reissue of the album, Rich Kienzle writes, "In Waylon's hands, "Smaller" becomes a moving commentary...and a reflection on mortality.  With Waylon gone since 2002, it stands today as an elegy."   Jennings managed only one original song for the LP, "Belle of the Ball."

The album cover is somewhat similar to the one on the Rolling Stones' 1968 album Beggar's Banquet, featuring a graffiti covered wall with references to Jennings' wife Jessi Colter ("JESSI"), RCA Records ("WHERE IS NIPPER?" and "VICTIM"), steel guitarist Ralph Mooney and a 1964 Roger Miller song ("MOON is HIGH SO AM I!), Nelson ("WILLIE WHO?"), Chips Moman ("CHIPS WUZ HEAR"), and the Grammy Awards ("My GRAMMY DON"T WORK!").  The red letters "F" and "Y" are strategically placed out of frame.

Reception
Ol' Waylon remained at #1 on Billboard'''s Top Country Albums chart for 13 weeks in 1977 (16 weeks on the Cash Box charts) and was certified Platinum by the RIAA. It also became Jennings' highest-charting album on the Billboard 200, where it peaked at number 15. Stephen Thomas Erlewine of AllMusic writes, "Overall, Ol' Waylon'' is pretty enjoyable, but it winds up feeling a little hollow, as if Jennings was trying to give the audience what it wanted. There are enough good moments to make it worthwhile, not just to the dedicated but for some casual fans enamored of the outlaw years, but it's still an album that gets by more on its style than substance."

Track listing
"Luckenbach, Texas (Back to the Basics of Love)" (Bobby Emmons, Chips Moman) – 3:22
"If You See Me Getting Smaller" (Jimmy Webb) – 3:39
"Lucille" (Roger Bowling, Hal Bynum) – 4:07
"Sweet Caroline" (Neil Diamond) – 3:10
"I Think I'm Gonna Kill Myself" (Buddy Knox) – 2:23
"Belle of the Ball" (Jennings) – 3:26
Medley: – 2:37
"That's All Right Mama" (Arthur Crudup)
"My Baby Left Me" (Crudup)
"Till I Gain Control Again" (Rodney Crowell) – 4:18
"Brand New Goodbye Song" (Moman, Reggie Young) – 2:54
"Satin Sheets" (Willis Alan Ramsey) – 2:43
"This is Getting Funny (But There Ain't Nobody Laughing)" (Michael Smotherman) – 2:48

Production
Produced By Chips Moman
Production Assistants: Gretchen Brennison, Jeremy Holiday
Engineers: Don Cobb, Neil Wilburn
Mastering: Vic Anesini, Steve Hoffman

Personnel
Waylon Jennings - guitar, vocals
Ritchie Albright - drums
Sherman Hayes - bass guitar
Johnny Christopher, Gordon Payne, Rance Wasson, Reggie Young - guitar
Ralph Mooney - steel guitar
Clifford Robertson - keyboards
Harrison Calloway Jr., Ronnie Eades, Muscle Shoals Horns, Charles Rose, Harvey Thompson - horns
Willie Nelson - co-lead vocals on “Luckenbach, Texas (Back to the Basics of Love)”
Johnny Christopher, Jessi Colter, Gordon Payne, Steve Pippin, Carter Robertson, Toni Wine - backing vocals

Charts

Weekly charts

Year-end charts

References

Waylon Jennings albums
1977 albums
RCA Records albums
Albums produced by Chips Moman